Peter Miles may refer to:

Peter Miles (courtier) (1924–2013), British courtier
Peter Miles (American actor) (1938–2002), American actor
Peter Miles (English actor) (1928–2018), English actor and singer
Peter Miles (musician) (born 1980), Ugandan musician
Peter Miles (record producer) (born 1982), English music executive

See also
Peter Myles (born 1969), Canadian film music editor
Miles (surname)